Reuben Eugene Bjorkman (born February 27, 1929) is a former head coach of the University of North Dakota Fighting Sioux hockey men's team.  A graduate of Roseau, Minnesota High School, where he led his team to a state championship in 1946, Bjorkman was a member of the US Olympic teams in 1948 and 1952 (silver medalists).  He was a three-year letter winner at the University of Minnesota.

Career
Bjorkman's high school coaching career began at Greenway High School in Coleraine, Minnesota.  His 1962 team competed in the Minnesota State High School Hockey Tournament.  His first college coaching season (1963–1964), at RPI, culminated with his team finishing third in the NCAA Championships.  Following that season he was hired as the Head Hockey Coach at the University of New Hampshire where spent four years prior to accepting the position at the University of North Dakota.

In 1982 Bjorkman was honored by the Minnesota Hockey Coaches Association when he was named the recipient of the Cliff Thompson Award, given for long term, outstanding contributions to the sport of hockey in Minnesota.  In 1997 The American Hockey Coaches Association recognized Bjorkman with the John "Snooks" Kelly Founders Award.  Named after the Boston College coach, this award honors those people in the coaching profession who have contributed to the overall growth and development of the sport of ice hockey in the United States.

Head coaching record

College

References

External links

Career coaching statistics at College Hockey News

1929 births
Living people
American men's ice hockey forwards
High school ice hockey coaches in the United States
Ice hockey players from Minnesota
Ice hockey players at the 1952 Winter Olympics
Medalists at the 1952 Winter Olympics
New Hampshire Wildcats men's ice hockey coaches
North Dakota Fighting Hawks men's ice hockey coaches
Olympic silver medalists for the United States in ice hockey
People from Roseau, Minnesota
RPI Engineers men's ice hockey coaches
Ice hockey coaches from Minnesota